Amanoa strobilacea is a species of plant in the family Phyllanthaceae. It is found in Angola, Cameroon, Ghana, and Liberia. It is threatened by habitat loss.

References

strobilacea
Vulnerable plants
Taxonomy articles created by Polbot